"Birthday" is a song by the English band Disclosure and American singer-songwriters Kehlani and Syd. It was released as the sixth single from the duo's third studio album Energy on 26 August 2020. The song was written by Guy Lawrence, Howard Lawrence, Kehlani Parrish and Sydney Bennett.

Background

Music video
A music video to accompany the release of "Birthday" was first released onto YouTube on 28 August 2020.

Track listing

Credits and personnel
Credits adapted from Tidal.

 Guy Lawrence – Producer, composer, lyricist, associated performer, mixer, programming, studio personnel
 Howard Lawrence – Producer, composer, lyricist, associated performer, programming
 Kehlani Parrish – Composer, lyricist, associated performer, vocals
 Sydney Bennett – Composer, lyricist, associated performer, vocals
 Stuart Hawkes – Mastering Engineer, studio personnel
 Ira Grylack – Recording Engineer, studio personnel

Charts

Weekly charts

Year-end charts

Release history

References

2020 songs
2020 singles
Disclosure (band) songs
Kehlani songs
Songs written by Guy Lawrence
Songs written by Howard Lawrence
Songs written by Kehlani